"Kitty" is a song by the American alternative rock band The Presidents of the United States of America. It originally appeared on the demo tape Froggystyle. This version was entitled "Kitty at My Foot". According to Dave Dederer, the song was based "as far as I know" on a true story about "a bad little cat that lived in some [apartment] Chris shared with some folks in Boston".

Description
The song describes a man's desire to pet a cat that has been out all night, implied to be a feral cat. After a moment of bliss, the cat turns on him and scratches him and he decides to let it spend the night outside again.

Music video
A music video for "Kitty" was created, however, was never released. In 2007, 12 years after the song released, the video was uploaded to their YouTube channel. In February 2023, it was remastered in HD.

Track listing

Initial pressing
 "Kitty" - 3:23
 "Kitty" (clean edit) - 3:23

Maxi CD
"Kitty" - 3:23
"Peaches" (live) - 3:15
"Lump" (live) - 2:17

Chart positions

References

1995 singles
Songs about cats
The Presidents of the United States of America (band) songs
Music videos directed by Roman Coppola